William Hildreth Hawes (November 17, 1853 – June 16, 1940) was a professional baseball player in the late 19th century. He mainly played in minor league level, but made two stints in the major leagues. His first season in the majors, in 1879, he played for the Boston Red Caps. He was one of only thirteen players for the team. He played rather poorly, having a batting average of just .200 and making ten errors in the outfield. He  would not play again in the majors until 1884 for the Cincinnati Outlaw Reds. He hit .278 but still fielded poorly, making 27 errors as an outfielder and first baseman. In 1893 he finished his career for the Lowell ball club in the New England League.

References 
 Baseball Reference

1853 births
1940 deaths
Boston Red Caps players
Cincinnati Outlaw Reds players
19th-century baseball players
Minor league baseball managers
Lowell (minor league baseball) players
Rochester (minor league baseball) players
Baltimore (minor league baseball) players
East Saginaw Grays players
Brockton (minor league baseball) players
Haverhill (minor league baseball) players
Minneapolis Millers (baseball) players
Milwaukee Brewers (minor league) players
Milwaukee Creams players
St. Paul Apostles players
Lowell Lowells players
Manchester (minor league baseball) players
Boston Reds (minor league) players
baseball players from New Hampshire
People from Nashua, New Hampshire